Magnificent Sinner (original French title: Katia) is a 1959 French film by director Robert Siodmak about the romance between Tsar Alexander II of Russia and the then-schoolgirl Catherine Dolgorukov, who later became his mistress and finally his morganatic wife. It stars Romy Schneider as Katia, a schoolgirl who becomes the Tsar's mistress and Curd Jürgens as Tsar Alexander II of Russia. The film, originally released as Katia,  was a remake of a 1938 French film of the same name, which starred Danielle Darrieux.

Plot
Produced in France, Magnificent Sinner stars Curd Jürgens as Tsar Alexander II, with Romy Schneider as the schoolgirl Katia who first becomes his mistress, before being elevated to the rank of princess. The romance between emperor and commoner leads to court intrigue and a weakening of the ties of loyalty between the Tsar's ministers and their ruler, and is instrumental in Alexander's ultimate assassination.

Cast
Romy Schneider as Katia
Curd Jürgens as Tsar Alexander II of Russia
Monique Mélinand as Tsarina Maria, wife of Alexander II
Pierre Blanchar as Koubaroff
Antoine Balpêtré as Kilbatchich 
Françoise Brion as Sophie 
Michel Bouquet as Bibesco
Bernard Dhéran as Stéphane Ryssakov

Margo Lion as the superintendent of  the Smolny Institute
Hubert Noël as Michel Dolgorouki
Yves Barsacq as Katourine
Gabrielle Dorziat as the Director of the Smolny Institute
Jacqueline Marbaux as Mlle Trépeau
Alain Saury as Soloviev
Hans Czille as the Tsarevich
Germaine Delbat as the Governess 
Egon von Jordan as  the aide de camp
Robert Le Béal as the Baron
Paul Mercey as the serf
Pierre-Jacques Moncorbier as Ryssakov
Martine Spira as Katia's sister-in-law
Hans Unterkircher as General Paskievitch

Reviews
Film critic Leonard Maltin gave the film two out of four stars, describing it as "lackluster." Bosley Crowther of The New York Times equally panned it as "an overstuffed costume picture" and "a hackneyed and ponderous bore."  "It would be just as good, if not better," he continued, "if it had been a tractor with which the Tsar fell in love."

References

External links

The Magnificent Sinner (1959), New York Times listing
Magnificent Sinner, TV guide listing
Magnificent Sinner Mubi listing

French drama films
Films directed by Robert Siodmak
Films set in Russia
Films set in the 1860s
Films set in the 1870s
Films set in the 1880s
1959 films
Remakes of French films
1950s French films